Roberto Onorati (born 5 February 1966) is an Italian former professional footballer who played as a midfielder.

Post-playing career 
From 1999 to 2000, Onorati was a board member at his former club Nice. For a short amount of time in September 2005, he was the sporting director of Pisa.

Honours 
Genoa

 Serie B: 1988–89
 Anglo-Italian Cup: 1995–96

Nice

 Coupe de France: 1996–97

Notes

References 

1966 births
Living people
Footballers from Rome
Italian footballers
Italian expatriate footballers
Expatriate footballers in France
Italian expatriate sportspeople in France
S.S. Lazio players
A.S. Lodigiani players
U.S. Pistoiese 1921 players
ACF Fiorentina players
Genoa C.F.C. players
U.S. Avellino 1912 players
OGC Nice players
Serie B players
Serie A players
Ligue 1 players
Ligue 2 players
OGC Nice non-playing staff
Pisa S.C. non-playing staff